Pilskalne Parish is an administrative unit of Augšdaugava Municipality in the Selonia region of Latvia (From 2009 until 2021, it was part of the former Ilūkste Municipality and before 2009 of the Daugavpils District).

Villages 

 Middle-sized villages (vidējciemi, 2):
 Pilskalne (parish centre) – 223 inhabitants (2009)
 Doļnaja – 167 inhabitants (2000)
 Small villages (mazciemi, 4):
Grivka
Kazimiriški
Sabaļi
Voitusola
 Scattered villages (skrajciemi, 19):
 Boltaiskrūgs
 Dronkusola
 Gekeļi
 Jaunlaši
 Kalniški
 Kalvāni
 Koņecpole
 Kreposte
 Kūliņi
 Lajiški
 Liellazdas
 Ludvigova
 Padomnieki
 Pristaņa
 Pupiņi
 Timšāni
 Vigodka
 Vilcāni
 Zamečka

Demographics 

According to the 2000 census, out of 1,305 inhabitants of the parish 954 (73,1%) were ethnic Latvians, 127 (9,7%) were Russians and 127 (9,7%) were Poles.

References

External links 
 Pilskalne parish 

Augšdaugava Municipality
Parishes of Latvia
Selonia